"Bang Bang" is a song recorded by American producer and rapper will.i.am featuring the vocals of Shelby Spalione. The single features as the third track on the soundtrack album of the 2013 Baz Luhrmann film The Great Gatsby. "Bang Bang" is also featured on the deluxe edition of will.i.am's fourth studio album #willpower. "Bang Bang" peaked within the top ten of the charts in Belgium (Wallonia) and the United Kingdom. In the latter country, will.i.am is a coach on The Voice UK, and an alternate version of the song featuring vocals from Leah McFall ― the runner-up on season two of the show ― is included on the compilation Now 86.

Composition
"Bang-Bang" is an up-tempo fusion of 1920s jazz instrumentals along with synth-pop elements. The track features partially Louis Armstrong-inspired lead vocals by will.i.am and additional sing-along by guest vocalist "Shelby Spalione". It incorporates elements of the 1923 Cecil Mack–James P. Johnson composition "Charleston". Lyrics include the line "My baby shot me down" from the 1966 song "Bang Bang (My Baby Shot Me Down)" by American recording artist Cher, written by Sonny Bono.

Live performances
will.i.am performed "Bang Bang" live on May 2, 2013, during season 12 of American Idol. 
He also performed the song in the United Kingdom with Leah McFall during the final of the second season of The Voice UK (will.i.am is a coach on the show). The original version of "Bang Bang" rose to a peak of number three on the UK Singles Chart following the performance. will.i.am later hinted that a duet version of the song with McFall would be officially released.

Controversy
In April 2013, controversy arose over allegations that two songs from #willpower – "Bang Bang" and "Let's Go" – may have used unauthorized samples from the EDM instrumentals "Epic" by Sandro Silva and Quintino and "Rebound" by Arty and Matt Zo. "Bang Bang", in particular, was alleged to have copied the chord progression of the drop from "Epic".

Music video
A music video to accompany the release of "Bang Bang" was first released onto YouTube on May 20, 2013, at a total length of two minutes and fifty-seven seconds. The video features a 1920s-themed speakeasy stage show by will.i.am and a band playing various brass instruments. He is later accompanied by Spalione in Charleston flappers-style; will.i.am and his band then perform highly choreographed routines. The video also features a tap dance solo by will.i.am.

Charts and certifications

Weekly charts

Year-end charts

Certifications

Release history

References

Will.i.am songs
2013 singles
The Great Gatsby
Songs written by will.i.am
Songs written by Sonny Bono
Songs with lyrics by Cecil Mack
2013 songs
Parlophone singles
Song recordings produced by will.i.am
Black-and-white music videos
Sampling controversies
Electro swing songs